Henry Samueli (born September 20, 1954) is an American businessman, engineer, and philanthropist.

He is the co-founder of Broadcom Corporation, owner of the National Hockey League's Anaheim Ducks, and a prominent philanthropist in the Orange County, California community. He serves as chairman of the Board of Broadcom Inc. He is also a Professor (on leave of absence) in the Electrical and Computer Engineering Department at UCLA, and a Distinguished Adjunct Professor in the Electrical Engineering and Computer Science Department at UC Irvine.

He holds honorary doctorate degrees from the Technion-Israel Institute of Technology and the National Chiao Tung University in Taiwan.

He is a named inventor in 75 U.S. patents. He is a Fellow of the Institute of Electrical and Electronics Engineers (IEEE) and a Fellow of the American Academy of Arts and Sciences (AAAS). He was also elected a member of the National Academy of Engineering (NAE) in 2003 for pioneering contributions to academic research and technology entrepreneurship in the broadband communications system-on-a-chip industry. In 2012 Samueli won the Marconi Prize and Fellowship for "pioneering advances in the development and commercialization of analog and mixed signal circuits for modern communication systems, in particular the cable modem.

Net worth 
As of February 2021, Forbes estimates Samueli's net worth at $6.3 billion.

Personal life 
Samueli resides with his wife Susan in Newport Beach, California.

Education
Samueli's parents, Sala and Aron, were Polish-Jewish immigrants who survived the German Nazi occupation of Europe and arrived in the United States with almost nothing. Samueli stocked shelves in his family's Los Angeles liquor store and graduated from Bancroft Junior High School and Fairfax High School. Samueli became interested in electronics while building an AM/FM radio during a shop class at Bancroft.

Samueli attended UCLA, where he received his bachelor's degree (1975), master's degree (1976), and Ph.D (1980), all in the field of electrical engineering. His Ph.D. advisor was Alan N. Willson Jr. and his Ph.D. dissertation is titled "Nonperiodic forced overflow oscillations in digital filters."

Broadcom origins
In 1991, while still working as a professor at UCLA, Samueli co-founded Broadcom Corporation with one of his Ph.D. students, Henry Nicholas. Each invested $5,000 and initially worked out of Nicholas' Redondo Beach home. They rented their first office in 1992 in Westwood, Los Angeles near the UCLA campus and moved to Irvine, CA in 1995 at which time Samueli took a leave of absence from UCLA to be at Broadcom full-time. Broadcom went public three years after that. Samueli still remains on leave from UCLA and he continues to be listed on the Electrical and Computer Engineering Department faculty roster.

Anaheim Ducks ownership
In 2003, the Samuelis purchased the management contract for the Arrowhead Pond of Anaheim sports and entertainment venue, creating Anaheim Arena Management, LLC, to oversee all operations of the arena, and in 2005 they purchased the Mighty Ducks of Anaheim National Hockey League (NHL) club, the arena's largest tenant, from the Walt Disney Company for $75 million. In 2006, the Samuelis announced the team's name change to the Anaheim Ducks and the arena's name change to Honda Center. In 2007 the Anaheim Ducks became the first California team ever to win the Stanley Cup championship.

As of December 2016, Samueli serves on the executive committee of the NHL Board of Governors.

In 2015 the Samuelis acquired ownership of the Ducks' American Hockey League affiliate, the Norfolk Admirals. They subsequently moved the franchise to San Diego as part of the AHL's western expansion that year and the team was re-branded as the fourth incarnation of the San Diego Gulls.

In 2017 Forbes reported the Anaheim Ducks were worth $415 million.

Philanthropy

After Broadcom went public in 1998 the Samueli Foundation was created. The foundation focuses its giving in the areas of education, health, youth services, and Jewish culture and values. In 2012 the Samuelis joined the Giving Pledge, initiated by Warren Buffett and Bill and Melinda Gates, whose members pledge the majority of their wealth to philanthropy.

Given Henry Samueli's background in engineering and education, some of their earliest philanthropic gifts were in these areas. In 1999 the Samuelis made major donations to the UCLA School of Engineering and Applied Science and the UC Irvine School of Engineering, both of which have since been named after him.

In 2009 Henry Samueli was a founding director of the Broadcom Foundation, a 501c(3) corporate nonprofit, and he is the chair of this philanthropy that advances science, technology, engineering and math (STEM). Broadcom Foundation sponsors the Broadcom MASTERS (Math, Applied Science, Technology and Engineering for Rising Stars) and the Broadcom MASTERS International, programs of Society for Science and the Public that inspire middle school students to continue math and science courses into high school in order to create pathways to STEM careers. Samueli was inspired by his own seventh grade experience of building a short wave radio from a Heathkit for innovation that he funded the Marconi/Samueli Award for Innovation with his Marconi Award. Henry and Susan Samueli also sponsor the top prize, the $25,000 Samueli Foundation Prize in the Broadcom MASTERS.

A major passion of Susan Samueli is in the areas of complementary and alternative medicine and integrative health and wellness. In 2001 the Samuelis established the Susan Samueli Center for Integrative Medicine at UC Irvine. They have also supported the research of the John Wayne Cancer Institute in Santa Monica, California, in cancer prevention and treatment. In 2017, the Samuelis made a transformational $200 million gift to UC Irvine to create the Susan and Henry Samueli College of Health Sciences, a first-of-its-kind College of Health Sciences focused on interdisciplinary integrative health. As part of the gift, the existing Susan Samueli Center for Integrative Medicine was elevated to become the Susan Samueli Integrative Health Institute.

Some of the other major naming gifts of the Samueli Foundation include the Samueli Theater at the Orange County Performing Arts Center in 2000, the Samueli Jewish Campus in Irvine, CA in 2001, the Sala and Aron Samueli Holocaust Memorial Library at Chapman University in 2003, the Samueli Academy, a public Charter High School in Santa Ana, CA for community, underserved, and foster teens in 2013.

In 2015, Samueli received a prize from the Israeli government for his global contribution to innovation and his contribution to innovation in Israel, at the "Innovex" conference for innovation in technology.

Samueli was named a 2017 Fellow by the National Academy of Inventors. Election to NAI Fellow status is the highest professional accolade bestowed to academic inventors.

To date, the Samuelis have committed over $500 million to philanthropic causes.

In June 2019, UCLA announced a $100-million gift from Samueli and his wife, Susan. The gift will be used to expand the engineering school.

Broadcom stock options & financial crimes investigation
During the technology boom in the 2000s, Samueli and Broadcom co-founder Henry T. Nicholas III awarded millions of stock options to attract and reward employees. Prosecutors alleged Samueli and Nicholas granted options to others, including some other top executives, but not themselves, to avoid having to report $2.2 billion in compensation costs to shareholders. In 2006 both the Securities and Exchange Commission and the Department of Justice began investigating Broadcom Corporation for backdating of stock options.

On May 15, 2008, Samueli resigned as chairman of the board and took a leave of absence as Chief Technology Officer after being named in a civil complaint by the SEC.

On June 23, 2008, Samueli pleaded guilty for lying to SEC for $2.2 billion of backdating. Under the plea bargain, Samueli agreed to a sentence of five years probation, a $250,000 criminal fine, and a $12 million payment to the US Treasury.

Prosecutors focused on the fact that Samueli denied under oath any role in making options grants to high-ranking executives. As part of his plea agreement, Samueli admitted the statement was false, and admitting to being part of the options-granting process. However, an internal Broadcom probe laid the majority of blame on CEO Henry Nicholas and CFO William Ruehle.

On September 8, 2008, U.S. District Court Judge Cormac Carney rejected the plea deal that called for Samueli to receive probation, writing: "The court cannot accept a plea agreement that gives the impression that justice is for sale".

16 months later, on December 10, 2009, Judge Carney, after hearing the testimony of all the witnesses at the trial of CFO William Ruehle, dismissed the case against Samueli (as well as Ruehle and Nicholas), citing Samueli's testimony as well as prosecutorial misconduct. In his ruling Judge Carney stated "The uncontroverted evidence at trial established that Dr. Samueli was a brilliant engineer and a man of incredible integrity. There was no evidence at trial to suggest that Dr. Samueli did anything wrong, let alone criminal. Yet, the government embarked on a campaign of intimidation and other misconduct to embarrass him and bring him down." He further added in his ruling "Needless to say, the government’s treatment of Dr. Samueli was shameful and contrary to American values of decency and justice." The judge ordered Dr. Samueli's plea agreement to be "expunged" from his record and stated "Dr. Samueli now has a clean slate."

Awards and honors 
2003, National Academy of Engineering
2004, American Academy of Arts and Sciences
2006, Golden Plate Award of the American Academy of Achievement 
2018, U.S. News STEM Leadership Hall of Fame
2018, National Academy of Inventors
2020, Ellis Island Medal of Honor
2021, IEEE Founders Medal

References

External links
Henry Samueli biography at the UCLA Department of Electrical Engineering
Henry Samueli biography at the Samueli Foundation
The Samueli Foundation

1954 births
American billionaires
American telecommunications industry businesspeople
American people of Polish-Jewish descent
Anaheim Ducks executives
Giving Pledgers
21st-century philanthropists
Jewish American sportspeople
Living people
Members of the United States National Academy of Engineering
National Hockey League executives
National Hockey League owners
Sportspeople from Buffalo, New York
Stanley Cup champions
UCLA Henry Samueli School of Engineering and Applied Science alumni
UCLA Henry Samueli School of Engineering and Applied Science faculty
American chief technology officers
Fellow Members of the IEEE
Fellows of the American Academy of Arts and Sciences
People from Newport Beach, California
21st-century American Jews